Waterford West is a suburb in the City of Logan, Queensland, Australia.

Geography
The eastern boundary and part of the southern boundary follow the course of the Logan River.

The suburb is home to Marsden State High School in the west.

It has a shopping centre called Waterford Plaza close to a road bridge across the Logan. Around this area the main roads, Kingston Road and Loganlea Road intersect. The area currently has some retail development as well as historical significance to Logan City. The centre adjoins a large lagoon known as Tygum Lagoon.

History 
In April 1885, several portions of subdivided land in an area known as Waterford North and South were advertised for auction by John Cameron. A map advertising the land shows the location of the subdivisions in proximity to the Upper Logan railway line and Tweed railway line and the Logan River. The land was owned by Henry Jordan and a supplement advertising the auction states that there was a quarry and sawmill on the land as well as two lagoons supplying fresh and pure water.

Waterford West State School opened on 27 January 1976.

Marsden State High School opened on 27 January 1987.

The median age of the Waterford West population was 33 years, 4 years below the national median of 37.  66.8% of people living in Waterford West were born in Australia. The other top responses for country of birth were New Zealand 8.7%, England 4.9%, Philippines 0.9%, Samoa 0.8%, Fiji 0.7%.  81.5% of people spoke only English at home; the next most common languages were 2% Samoan, 1.3% Khmer, 0.8% Romanian, 0.6% Hindi, 0.5% Tagalog.

Education 
Waterford West State School is a government primary (Prep-6) school for boys and girls at John Street. In 2018, the school had an enrolment of 674 students with 52 teachers (49 full-time equivalent) and 32 non-teaching staff (21 full-time equivalent). It includes a special education program.

Marsden State High School is a government secondary (7-12) school for boys and girls at 106-130 Muchow Road. In 2018, the school had an enrolment of 2199 students with 161 teachers (154 full-time equivalent) and 94 non-teaching staff (71 full-time equivalent). It includes a special education program.

Amenities 
Logan Wesleyan Methodist Church is at 877 Kingston Road; it is part of the Wesleyan Methodist Church of Australia.

References

External links

 
 Logan Map